Katie Henry is an American blues rock singer, guitarist, pianist and songwriter. She has released two solo albums since 2018, and is currently signed to Ruf Records. Her most recent album, On My Way, reached number six on the Billboard Top Blues Albums Chart.

Life and career
Henry was raised in Vernon Township, New Jersey, and attended Vernon Township High School before transferring to Pope John XXIII Regional High School. She started to learn to play the piano at the age of six, and was encouraged by his musical family giving her access to recordings by the Beatles, the Doors and Janis Joplin.  Henry began writing songs in the back of her school notebooks. "Me and Bobby McGee" was the first song that she performed in public, although it took until her teenage years before Henry got interested in blues, then relishing recordings of Elmore James, Freddie King and John Lee Hooker. She attended Manhattan College, playing on evenings and weekends, at open mic events and later with a Bronx-based blues band, before going solo and performing in New York blues clubs.

She self-released her debut album, High Road, on November 21, 2018. Henry sang and played piano, clavinet and guitar, with the keyboard player John Ginty adding his skills as performer and record producer. The ten tracks on the album were jointly written by Henry and Antar Goodwin (her bassist and musical director). The recording earned her national recognition, including nominations from both the International Bluegrass Music Awards and Blues Blast. 

The recording processes for her sophomore album began in May 2021, at Brooklyn's Degraw Sound Studios. Henry was joined by the record producer and guitarist Ben Rice, her bassist Antar Goodwin, plus Kurt Thum (piano and organ), Greg Wieczorek (drums), and the British harmonicist Giles Robson. Henry stated "We recorded the album live during the pandemic, and it was so fun to be able to record in a room with people after feeling isolated for such a long time. The majority of the album was laid down live, and I love that feeling. It's like capturing lightning in a bottle". Henry's guitar playing was more to the fore on On My Way than her previous record. On My Way was released on January 28, 2022 via Ruf Records. The album contained ten original songs, co-written with Goodwin. The critical acclaim included tributes fron Henry Yates of Classic Rock, plus NME, and The Guardian, the latter of which saluted "a runaway talent you need to keep up with".

Her international debut came via her involvement with Ruf Records's 2022 Blues Caravan Revue. She appeared along with Will Jacobs and Ghalia Volt, and a CD was released of the live performance highlights. In late 2022, Henry commenced the second leg of her European tour in support of the On My Way album. By this time the record had reached a high of number six on the Billboard Top Blues Albums Chart.

Discography

Albums

References

External links
Official website

Year of birth missing (living people)
Living people
American blues singers
American blues guitarists
American blues singer-songwriters
American women guitarists
American women pianists
American women songwriters
Blues rock musicians
Songwriters from New Jersey
Guitarists from New Jersey
Manhattan College alumni
Singers from New Jersey
People from Vernon Township, New Jersey
Pope John XXIII Regional High School alumni
21st-century American male singers
21st-century American singers
21st-century American guitarists